Minuscule 464 (in the Gregory-Aland numbering), α 165 (in the Soden numbering), is a Greek minuscule manuscript of the New Testament, on parchment. Palaeographically it has been assigned to the 11th century. 
Formerly it was labelled by 106a and 122p.
Minuscule 464 has been identified as the same manuscript as Minuscule 252.

Description 

The codex contains the text of the Acts of the Apostles, Catholic epistles, and Pauline epistles on 229 parchment leaves. It contains also liturgical books with hagiographies: Synaxarion, Menologion.

It is carefully written in one column per page, 33 lines per page.

The order of books is usual for the Greek manuscripts: Acts, Catholic epistles, and Pauline epistles.

Kurt Aland the Greek text of the codex did not place in any Category.

History 

Formerly it belonged to the same manuscript as codex 252 (Gospels).

The manuscript came from the Vatopedi monastery at Mount Athos to Moscow.

Formerly it was labelled by 106a and 122p. In 1908 C. R. Gregory gave the number 464 to it.

The manuscript was examined by Matthaei and Treu. It is currently housed at the State Historical Museum (S. 328) in Moscow.

See also 

 List of New Testament minuscules
 Biblical manuscript
 Textual criticism
 Minuscule 463

References

Further reading 

 C. F. Matthaei, Novum Testamentum Graece et Latine (Riga, 1782-1788), p. 181f. (as m)
 Die griechischen Handschriften des Neuen Testaments in der UdSSR; eine systematische Auswertung des Texthandschriften in Leningrad, Moskau, Kiev, Odessa, Tbiblisi und Erevan, Texte und Untersuchungen 91 (Berlin, 1966), pp. 251–254.

External links 
 

Greek New Testament minuscules
11th-century biblical manuscripts